Nichole Sakura O'Connor (formerly credited as Nichole Bloom), is an American actress and model. She is perhaps best known for her role as Cheyenne in the NBC sitcom Superstore.

Career 
She had the recurring role of Amanda on Shameless from 2014 to 2016. 

In 2015, she was added to the main cast of the NBC sitcom Superstore as Cheyenne, a 17-year-old store employee who is pregnant at the start of the series.

Personal life 
Sakura is of Irish and Japanese descent.

She initially identified in the industry as Nichole Bloom (the last name derived from her Japanese name Sakura, which means "Cherry Blossom"), but stated in an Instagram post in August 2020 that she had changed her name and would be known professionally as Nichole Sakura.

Filmography

Film

Television

Video games

References

External links 

21st-century American actresses
American film actresses
American video game actresses
Actresses from San Francisco
Female models from California
American people of Irish descent
American actresses of Japanese descent
American film actors of Asian descent
USC School of Dramatic Arts alumni
Living people
1989 births